Hitchhiker 2 (or P-11 4202, P-11 AS and OPS 3316) was a satellite launched by U.S. Air Force. It was launched with the aim of studying and measuring cosmic radiation. The satellite was the second successful satellite of the P-11 program, following the failure of the first Hitchhiker satellite in March 1963. It was launched on October 29, 1963 from Vandenberg Air Force Base, California, on a Thor-Agena launch vehicle.

On May 23, 1965, the satellite re-entered the Earth's atmosphere.

Instruments
 1 Geiger tube (40-4 MeV)
 1 Faraday cup plasma
 1 Electron detector (0.3-5.0 MeV)
 1 Proton detector (0.7-5.3 MeV)
 2 electrostatic analysers (4-100 keV)

See also 

 Corona program

References 

1963 in spaceflight